Niesthreini is a tribe of scentless plant bugs in the family Rhopalidae. There are at least 2 genera and about 17 described species in Niesthreini.

Genera
These two genera belong to the tribe Niesthreini:
 Arhyssus Stål, 1870 i c g b
 Niesthrea Spinola, 1837 i c g b
Data sources: i = ITIS, c = Catalogue of Life, g = GBIF, b = Bugguide.net

References

Further reading

External links

 

Rhopalinae